The 1906 Independence Coyotes went 69-48 and won the Kansas State League championship.  Ben Haas hit .341 to lead the league, while pitcher Chick Brandom paced the circuit with 16 wins and 121 strikeouts.

The league folded after the season, and the Coyotes moved to the Oklahoma–Arkansas–Kansas League and became known as the Independence Champs.

Location: Independence, Kansas
League: Kansas State League 1906
Affiliation:
Ballpark:

Year-by-year record

Timeline

Defunct minor league baseball teams
Baseball teams established in 1906
Sports clubs disestablished in 1906
Independence, Kansas
1906 establishments in Kansas
Defunct baseball teams in Kansas
Baseball teams disestablished in 1906
1906 disestablishments in Kansas
Kansas State League teams